Priyantha may refer to

Ashoka Priyantha, Sri Lankan politician
Janaka Priyantha Bandara, Sri Lankan politician
Priyantha Jayawardena, judge
Nalin Priyantha, Sri Lankan athlete

Sinhalese masculine given names